Eelco Uri (born 5 December 1973) is a Dutch former water polo player. He was a member of the Netherlands men's national water polo team. He competed with the team at the 1994 and 2001 World Championships; the 1995, 1997, 1999, 2001, and 2003 European Championships; and the 1996 Summer Olympics and 2000 Summer Olympics. He played 256 tests.

References

External links
 

1973 births
Living people
Dutch male water polo players
Water polo players at the 1996 Summer Olympics
Water polo players at the 2000 Summer Olympics
Olympic water polo players of the Netherlands
People from Rhenen
Sportspeople from Utrecht (province)
20th-century Dutch people